Ponta Figo is a village on São Tomé Island. It is 2 km south of Neves. Its population is 615 (2012 census).

Population history

References

Populated places in Lembá District